Vessel (TKA) is a structure and visitor attraction built as part of the Hudson Yards Redevelopment Project in Manhattan, New York City, New York. Built to plans by the British designer Thomas Heatherwick, the elaborate honeycomb-like structure rises 16 stories and consists of 154 flights of stairs, 2,500 steps, and 80 landings for visitors to climb. Vessel is the main feature of the  Hudson Yards Public Square. Funded by Hudson Yards developer Related Companies, its final cost is estimated at $200 million.

The concept of Vessel was unveiled to the public on September 14, 2016. Construction began in April 2017, with the pieces being manufactured in Italy and shipped to the United States. Vessel topped out in December 2017 with the installation of its highest piece, and it opened to the public on March 15, 2019. In January 2021, following three suicides at the Vessel, it was indefinitely closed to the public. The Vessel reopened in May 2021, then indefinitely closed again after another suicide two months later.

The TKA abbreviation in the structure's name stands for "Temporarily Known As". Upon its opening, Vessel received mixed reviews, with some critics praising its prominent placement within Hudson Yards, and others deriding the structure as extravagant. Vessel was also initially criticized for its restrictive copyright policy regarding photographs of the structure, as well as its lack of accessibility for disabled visitors, although both issues were subsequently addressed.

Description

Structure 

Vessel is a 16-story,  structure of connected staircases between the buildings of Hudson Yards, located in the  Hudson Yards Public Square. Designed by Thomas Heatherwick, Vessel has 154 flights, 2,500 steps, and 80 landings, with the total length of the stairs exceeding . The copper-clad steps, arranged like a jungle gym and modeled after Indian stepwells, can hold 1,000 people at a time. The structure also has ramps and an elevator to comply with the Americans with Disabilities Act of 1990 (ADA), though only three of Vessel's landings are ADA-accessible .

Stephen Ross, the CEO of Hudson Yards' developer Related Companies, said that its unusual shape was intended to make the structure stand out like a "12-month Christmas tree". Heatherwick said that he intends visitors to climb and explore the structure as if it were a jungle gym. At the top of the structure, visitors can see the Hudson River.

Surroundings

Vessel is located in and was designed in concert with the Hudson Yards Public Square, designed by Thomas Woltz of Nelson Byrd Woltz Landscape Architects. The  space hosts 28,000 plants and 225 trees in total. A canopy of trees is located in the southern area of the plaza. The southeast entrance to the plaza also includes a fountain. A "seasonally expressive" garden stands across from Vessel outside the entrance to the New York City Subway's 34th Street–Hudson Yards station. The plaza is also connected to the High Line, an elevated promenade that extends south of Hudson Yards.

Cost and assembly 
Although Vessel had originally been slated to cost $75 million, the projections were later revised to between $150 and $200 million. Heatherwick attributed the greatly increased price tag to the complexity of building the steel pieces. The pieces of Vessel were assembled in the comune of Monfalcone in Italy. Ships transported the sections of the sculpture to Hudson River docks.

Name 
"Vessel" was planned to be the structure's temporary name during construction, with a permanent name to be determined later. After Vessel opened, Hudson Yards asked the public to give it a formal name, creating a website devoted to that effect.

History 

In an interview with Fortune magazine, Ross said that he "wanted to commission something transformational, monumental", which led to the concept for Vessel. Ross was looking to five unnamed artists who were renowned for designing similar plazas, then asked them for in-depth proposals. He rejected all of the plans, at which point a colleague introduced Ross to Heatherwick. Six weeks after they talked, Ross accepted Heatherwick's proposal immediately because it "had everything I wanted". In an interview with designboom, Heatherwick said that his design for Vessel originated from a childhood experience when he "fell in love with an old discarded flight of wooden stairs outside a local building site". The media first reported Heatherwick's commissioning in October 2013.

The concept of Vessel was unveiled to the public on September 14, 2016, in an event attended by hundreds of people including New York City Mayor Bill de Blasio. Hosted by Anderson Cooper, the event featured a performance from the Alvin Ailey American Dance Theater that evoked the interlocking design of Vessel staircases.

In April 2017, the first major piece of the sculpture was installed at Hudson Yards. Construction started on April 18 with the installation of the first 10 pieces of the 75-piece structure. It was projected for completion in the spring of 2019, with the other 65 pieces arriving in five batches. The structure topped out in December 2017. In October 2018, it was announced that the opening of Vessel had been scheduled for March 15, 2019, and that tickets to enter the structure would become available in February. By January 2019, Hudson Yards officials were soliciting public suggestions for a rename of Vessel. Though the structure had no official name, the Hudson Yards website called it the "Hudson Yards Staircase". Vessel opened as scheduled on March 15, 2019.

Controversies 
Vessel was criticized for its associated photo policies at the time of its opening. Hudson Yards, the owner of Vessel, claimed ownership of all pictures and videos taken of Vessel, and reserves the right to use any photos or videos taken for commercial purposes without paying royalty fees. This privileged use of photos and videos by Hudson Yards, a private company, has been criticized because Hudson Yards has benefited from $4.5 billion in tax revenue. After criticism emerged about Vessel's copyright policy, Hudson Yards modified the policy so visitors would have ownership of photos of Vessel.

After Vessel opened, critics wrote that it was largely inaccessible for wheelchair users. As built, Vessel mainly consisted of stairs, with only a single elevator to connect one of the sets of landings. Because of this, disability-rights groups protested outside the structure. The United States Department of Justice filed a complaint alleging that because of the number of separate landings within Vessel, most of the structure was not compliant with the Americans with Disabilities Act, except for the portions directly outside the elevator. Furthermore, elevator stops on the fifth and seventh stories were sometimes skipped due to overcrowding concerns. In December 2019, Related Companies and Vessel operator ERY Vessel LLC reached an agreement with the Department of Justice to increase accessibility to the structure by adding wheelchair lifts and retaining elevator access to all levels.

Suicides 
On February 1, 2020, a 19-year-old man jumped from the sixth floor of the structure and died; the media reported this as the first such incident involving the Vessel. On December 22, 2020, a 24-year-old woman jumped from the top of the structure and also died. A third fatality occurred less than a month later on January 11, 2021, when a 21-year-old man jumped from the Vessel. Following the third death, the structure was indefinitely closed while the Related Companies consulted with experts on a strategy to prevent future suicides. Residents of the surrounding neighborhoods hired a suicide prevention expert, who suggested adding netting or raising the glass barriers. However, no changes were ultimately made to the barriers.

Vessel was reopened at the end of May 2021, but all visitors were required to be accompanied by at least one other person. In addition, after the first hour of each day, all visitors above five years old had to pay $10 for a ticket. Tickets for the first hour of the day, as well as tickets for children five and under, were free. Revenue from ticket sales was to directly fund additional safety upgrades.  Two months after Vessel reopened, on July 29, 2021, a 14-year-old boy jumped to his death while he was with his family. After the fourth death, Vessel was again closed indefinitely. Stephen Ross said at the time he was considering closing the structure permanently. By August 2022, Hudson Yards officials were installing safety nets around Vessel in preparation for the structure's possible reopening.

Critical reception 

The sculpture has received both acclaim and criticism. Fortune writer Shawn Tully called Vessel "Manhattan's answer to the Eiffel Tower", a sentiment echoed by CNN reporter Tiffany Ap. Elle Decor writer Kelsey Kloss compared Vessel to an M. C. Escher drawing. Several commentators have referred to the structure as the Giant Shawarma.  Speaking about the structure's design process, Heatherwick said, "We had to think of what could act as the role of a landmarker. Something that could help give character and particularity to the space."

Ted Loos of The New York Times said the sculpture, while a "stairway to nowhere" in the utilitarian sense, served as an "exclamation point" to the northern terminus of the High Line. David Colon of Gothamist called Vessel "a bold addition to the city's landscape". Public Art Fund president Susan Freedman liked the renderings for Vessel but called it "a leap of faith in terms of scale". She said there might be too much demand for Vessel, especially considering the structure's proximity to the High Line.

Other critics reviewed Vessel negatively. New York Times architecture critic Michael Kimmelman called Vessel's exterior "gaudy" and criticized Hudson Yards more generally as a "gated community" that lacked real public space. CityLabs Feargus O'Sullivan called Vessel, along with Heatherwick's other numerous billionaire-funded developments and architectural projects, "a gaudy monument to being only ever-so-slightly free." Some have contrasted it negatively to Cloud Gate, also known as the Bean, in Millennium Park, Chicago, calling Vessel a "piece of junk" and an "eyesore". Blair Kamin of the Chicago Tribune called it "willful and contrived".

Gallery

References

External links 

 
 The Vessel; Thomas Heatherwick's Oversized public art structure on CBS Sunday Morning

2019 establishments in New York City
2010s in Manhattan
Cultural infrastructure completed in 2019
Buildings and structures in Manhattan
Buildings developed by the Related Companies
Hudson Yards, Manhattan
Outdoor sculptures in Manhattan
Thomas Heatherwick
Tourist attractions in Manhattan
Towers in New York (state)